The 1973 National Rowing Championships was the second edition of the National Championships, held from 21–22 July 1973 at the National Water Sports Centre in Holme Pierrepont, Nottingham.

Senior

Medal summary

Junior

Medal summary 

Key

References 

British Rowing Championships
British Rowing Championships
British Rowing Championships